Tandem Group is a British-based designer, developer, distributor and retailer of sports, leisure and mobility products. Based in Castle Bromwich, West Midlands, the company is listed on the Alternative Investment Market of the London Stock Exchange.

Operations
The group structure comprises three main divisions:

Tandem Group Cycles
Tandem Group Cycles designs, manufactures and distributes bicycles and bicycle accessories under the Boss, Claud Butler, British Eagle, Dawes, Elswick, Pulse, Falcon, Squish and Townsend brands.

MV Sports & Leisure
MV Sports and Leisure owns and licenses various rights to design, develop and distribute sporting goods products under various brands, including: Ben Sayers, Hedstrom, Pot Black, Kickmaster, Marvel Avengers*, Barbie*, Batman*, Bing*, Bored, Cars*, Disney Princess*, E-Moto, Fireman Sam*, Frozen*, Hot Wheels*, Incredibles*, Jurassic World Fallen Kingdom*, Justice League*, Li-Fe, The Lion King*, L.O.L Surprise!*, Minions*, Minnie Mouse*, Miraculous*, My Little Pony*, Nerf*, Nickelodeon Slime*, Paw Patrol*, Peppa Pig*, PJ Masks*, Ricky Zoom*, Spider-Man*, Sponge Bob*, Street Quins*, Stunted, Thomas and Friends*, Toy Story*, Transformers*, Trolls*, Twista, U-Move, Wigwam, Wired, Zoomies (*under licence).

Expressco Direct
Expressco sells garden and outdoor products (Garden Comforts), mobility scooters (Pro Rider Mobility), home (At Home Comforts) and leisure products (Pro Rider Leisure). The company sells gazebos, party tents, trampolines and outdoor play products through its brand Airwave, home products including radiator covers with the Jack Stonehouse brand, Pro Rider branded mobility scooters and electric golf trolleys and snap frames through the SnapFrames website.

History 
In August 2014, the group purchased Pro Rider Mobility Limited for £2.5M with additional consideration of up to £1 million.

On 2 September 2015, the group took over E.S.C (Europe) Ltd in a deal of £2.1 million with additional consideration of up to £750,000.

On 20 June 2018, BikeZaar collaborated with Tandem Group Cycles.

References

External links
Company website

Companies based in Solihull
Sporting goods manufacturers of the United Kingdom
Companies listed on the Alternative Investment Market